The Rio Flor do Prado Ecological Station ( is an ecological station in Brazil.
It protects an area of Amazon rainforest and is administered the state of Mato Grosso.

Location

It is to the east of the Roosevelt River.
The area is on the right bank of the Flor do Prado River, a tributary of the Roosevelt River, and is bordered by indigenous territories.
It is in the Amazon biome.
It has just over 66% open rainforest and about 34% dense rainforest.

Conservation

The Rio Flor do Prado Ecological Station was created by decree 2.124 of 9 December 2003.
The advisory council was established on 15 December 2014.

Notes

Sources

2003 establishments in Brazil
Ecological stations of Brazil
Protected areas of Mato Grosso
Protected areas established in 2003